Czar Peter House may refer to:

 Cabin of Peter the Great
 Czar Peter House (Netherlands)